Gumbino (Gömbä) is a rural locality (a village) in Kashkinsky Selsoviet, Askinsky District, Bashkortostan, Russia. The population was 141 as of 2010. There are 5 streets.

Geography 
Gumbino is located 44 km southeast of Askino (the district's administrative centre) by road. Kashkino is the nearest rural locality.

References 

Rural localities in Askinsky District